is the current Japanese Vice-Minister for Foreign Affairs in charge of administration. Prior to his current position, Yabunaka served as Ministry of Foreign Affair's Asian and Oceanian Affairs Bureau Director-General. He has been a diplomat for nearly forty years.

Diplomacy
Before entering government service, Yabunaka was a senior researcher at the International Institute for Strategic Studies from 1990-1991. In 1998, Yabunaka became Consul General of Japan in Chicago US, and visited the country on several occasions.

Yabunaka has represented Japan on a number of occasions, and has negotiated trade deals with the United States, Australia, and Indonesia. He has had contact with a number of United States diplomats, including hosting current United States Ambassador to Japan John Roos shortly following Roos' appointment. During the first, second, and third rounds of the Six-party talks, Yabunaka represented Japan as chief delegate. The Japanese government also sent Yabanuka as a delegate to China to discuss issues of natural gas reserves under the East China Sea.

He handled Myanmar relations during the Kenji Nagai shooting incident, demanding an investigation and challenging governmental claims. Yabunaka replaced Toshiyuki Takano as Director-General of Asian and Oceanian Affairs Bureau in 2002. In 2008, Yabunaka held talks with South Korean Ambassador Kwon Chul Hyun over disputed islets in the Sea of Japan.

Notes

References

 

Japanese diplomats
1948 births
Living people
Government ministers of Japan
Osaka University alumni
Academic staff of Osaka University